Isle of Man Airport (Manx: Purt Aer Vannin, also known as Ronaldsway Airport)  is the main civilian airport on the Isle of Man. Along with the Isle of Man Sea Terminal, it is one of the two main gateways to the island. The airport has scheduled services to the United Kingdom and the Republic of Ireland.

History

Early years
Ronaldsway was first used as an airfield in 1928 with passenger services to the UK starting in 1933, operated by Blackpool and West Coast Air Services (later West Coast Air Services). Further services were established by Aer Lingus and Railway Air Services (RAS) from 1934. From 1937 RAS operations from Ronaldsway to the UK were transferred to Isle of Man Air Services. In a 1936 expansion of the Ronaldsway Airport, workers discovered a mass grave believed to hold the remains of soldiers who died during the Battle of Ronaldsway in 1275.

Second World War

RAF Ronaldsway
The airfield came under Royal Air Force control at the outbreak of the Second World War. Known as RAF Ronaldsway, it was one of the few airfields that continued operating civilian flights throughout the wartime period.

The airfield was used by № 1 GDGS (Ground Defence and Gunnery School) operating Westland Wallace aircraft, the drogues from these aircraft being fired on from gun emplacements on St Michael's Isle (Fort Island) and Santon Head. An expansion of the airport during the War led to the discovery of the archaeological remains of a Neolithic settlement belonging to what is now called the Ronaldsway culture, in honour of this site.

RAF operations continued until 1943 when the airfield was handed over to the Admiralty for further development as a Fleet Air Arm training station.

HMS 
Now a naval air station, RNAS Ronaldsway, the airport was taken out of commission in 1943 for almost twelve months of extensive development undertaken by John Laing & Son. By the summer of 1944 the airfield had evolved from a grass landing area with a few hangars to a four runway airfield with the infrastructure to house and operate three training squadrons using Barracuda torpedo bombers.

The airfield's main role was that of a torpedo working-up station. No. 1 OTU consisted of 710, 713 and 747 Squadrons (Fleet Air Arm) and these operated until the cessation of hostilities in 1945. The base was paid off on 14 January 1946, and transferred to 'Care and Maintenance' under . The nominal depot ship from 21 June 1944 was a 32' cutter named XXII, which itself was constructed in 1937.

Post-war
The airport reverted to solely civilian flying almost immediately after the war, but the airfield remained in Admiralty possession until sold to the Isle of Man Government for £200,000 in 1948, far short of the £1 million that the UK Government had spent on constructing the airport buildings and runways, plus the £105,000 that was paid by the Admiralty in 1943 to purchase the site. Several Manx-based airlines were formed in the early postwar years to operate scheduled and charter services to the UK mainland.

Development since the 2000s
A project by Ellis Brown Architects began in November 1998 to extend the airport and improve the facilities available to passengers. In March 2000 the new extension was opened, providing a new landside catering outlet, arrivals area, baggage hall, and departure lounge. The existing part of the airport was refurbished during this time to provide improved check-in facilities and offices, linked to the extension with a new airport entrance. During the extension and renovation period, the iconic Three Legs of Man sculpture adorning the airport's façade was also refurbished. In March 2006 funding for a further extension was granted by Tynwald to increase the number of departure gates, with work due for completion in summer 2007.

In April 2008 Tynwald granted a major runway extension and resurfacing project at the airport. The runway will be extended by  out into the Irish Sea by the construction of a rock-armoured promontory. It was part of a £44m plan which also included resurfacing of the runway during summer 2008 and the extension program that will commence in spring 2008 work was completed by early 2011.  It has emerged that the actual runway take-off length was underestimated by 160 metres in the £1.5 million feasibility study. Whilst the study originally looked into the aviation marketing implication of runway length, airport management has now denied that the extension is for the use of heavier aircraft in the future, stating that the resurfacing and extension are to comply with the latest international safety standards. There has been a significant overspend on the project due to poor foreign exchange management of the Euro-denominated components of the costs. It is thought that the Manx Treasury Minister may have been referring to the expense of the runway and the additional £6,515,000 control tower project when he stated in his 2009 Budget speech that the Isle of Man could no longer afford "Rolls-Royce" projects. Following the completion of the runway extension project the largest aircraft that can operate fully at Ronaldsway is the Boeing 757.

In September 2019, Flybe announced it would shut down its base operations at the airport by Spring 2020.

Airlines and destinations

The following airlines operate regular scheduled flights to and from the Isle of Man:

Other tenants
Now-defunct regional airlines  Citywing and Manx Airlines had their head offices on the airport property. The Manx Military and Aviation Museum is situated next to the airport and has exhibits and information about the history of aviation on the island.

Statistics

In 2022, 562,490 passengers travelled through the airport, a 200.18% increase compared with 2021 - however this figure is down 35% compared to 2019 (prior to the COVID-19 pandemic).

Ground transport

Bus services are provided by Bus Vannin, formerly Isle of Man Transport. Bus Vannin routes 1, 1H, 2,  2A, 2C, 11, 12 and 12A serve Douglas, Castletown, Colby, Port Erin and Port St Mary. Buses operate every 20 minutes Monday – Saturday daytime (Services 1, 1H and 2) and every 30 minutes during evenings and Sunday (Services 1H, 2A, 11, 12 and 12A). Routes 8 and 8A also connect the airport with Peel – St John's – Foxdale and Castletown.

Airport emergency services

Fire and rescue service
In common with most international airports, the Isle of Man Airport maintains its own fire service. This service cooperates closely with the Isle of Man Fire and Rescue Service, although it is independent, with its own management and chief officer. For joint operational purposes, and for the assigning of radio call signs to appliances, the airport fire station is known as "station 9", in a common series with the IoM Fire & Rescue Service, whose seven fire stations are numbered from "station 1" to "station 7" inclusive. The airport fire station is a large five-bay purpose-built structure with duty rooms and offices. The service operates a fleet including two Carmichael Cobra 2 major foam tenders, a third (smaller) major foam tender, a standard duty pump (principally for building fires), and a 4x4 Land Rover. A further major appliance (Iturri Torro) is on order.

Police and security service

The Isle of Man Airport Police was a small independent police service providing security and policing at the airport site, with warranted constables, known as "aviation security officers" (ASO). Under Manx law ASOs had full police powers, including the power of arrest, whilst on airport property. For major crimes the airport police was supported by the Isle of Man Constabulary. The airport police were disbanded at the end of September 2019, with the responsibility for airfield security passing to a private contractor.

Accidents and incidents
On 26 January 1935, Hillman's Airways de Havilland Dragon Rapide G-ACPO, operating a mail flight from Aldergrove Airport, Belfast to Stapleford Aerodrome, Abridge, Essex via Speke Airport, Liverpool, Merseyside crashed at Derbyhaven, Isle of Man, whilst attempting to divert to Ronaldsway during bad weather.
On 23 March 1936, United Airways Spartan Cruiser G-ADEL crashed at Ronaldsway. The aircraft was operating a mail flight from Hall Caine Airport, Ramsey. The aircraft was dismantled and departed the island on board  of the Isle of Man Steam Packet Company. It was repaired by its manufacturers and returned to service.
On 9 May 1938, de Havilland Express G-AENR of Isle of Man Air Services crashed on landing at Ronaldsway Airport. The aircraft was operating a mail flight from Speke Airport, Liverpool, Merseyside. Despite substantial damage to the port lower wing and both port engines, the aircraft was repaired and returned to service.
On 14 September 1938, de Havilland Express G-ADVK of Isle of Man Air Services lost the starboard inner propeller in flight whilst operating a flight from Speke to Ronaldsway. The propeller embedded itself in the fuselage of the aircraft. A successful landing was made at Ronaldsway.

References

Bibliography

External links 

 
 
 

Buildings and structures in the Isle of Man
Art Deco airports
Ronaldsway